James F. Quinlan (May 29, 1922 – July 13, 2003) was an American professional basketball player. He played in the National Basketball League for the Rochester Royals in three games during the 1946–47 season. He also played for the Wheeling Blues in the All-American Basketball League during the 1948–49 season.

Born and raised in Dansville, New York, Quinlan played at Dansville High School before embarking on a collegiate career at Canisius College. He earned varsity letters during the 1941–42 and 1942–43 seasons, then had to leave school to fight in World War II. He was wounded in both legs during service while in the South Pacific. In his final season of college basketball eligibility, Quinlan returned to play for the Golden Griffins in the second half of the 1945–46 season.

In Quinlan's post-basketball career, he worked for Keebler Company Incorporated for 28 years. He died on July 13, 2003 in Wayland, New York.

References

1922 births
2003 deaths
American men's basketball players
United States Marine Corps personnel of World War II
Basketball players from New York (state)
Canisius Golden Griffins men's basketball players
Forwards (basketball)
People from Dansville, New York
Rochester Royals players
Sportspeople from Rochester, New York